The 1897 Michigan Agricultural Aggies football team was an American football team that represented Michigan Agricultural College (MAC), now known as Michigan State University, during the 1897 college football season. The Aggies compiled a 4–2–1 record and outscored their opponents 146 to 106.

The 1897 season was the first in which the MAC football team had a coach. Henry Keep, an engineering student who had transferred from the University of Michigan, was the first coach.

The 1897 season also featured the first installment of the Michigan State–Notre Dame football rivalry. Notre Dame won the game at South Bend, Indiana, by 34 to 6 score. Fullback Wells scored a touchdown for the Aggies.

During the 1897 season, MAC also played two games each against nearby Olivet College and Alma College.  The Aggies defeated Alma in both games and secured one win and one tie against Olivet.

A game against Michigan State Normal School (later Eastern Michigan University) was cancelled, because MAC accused the Normal School of fielding a team that was "not made up entirely of college men."

Schedule

References

Michigan Agricultural
Michigan State Spartans football seasons
Michigan Agricultural Aggies football